Makkan may refer to:

 Makkan (civilization), an ancient region in the Near East
 Makkan, Markazi, a village in Iran
Makkan, an inhabitant of Makka

See also 
 Maccan, a community in Canada
 Mackan, a townland in Ireland